The Aged and Disability Pensioners Party was a minor Australian political party that contested the 2004 federal election. The party was established on 13 December 2001. It supported the rights of pensioners. It was dissolved on 18 January 2006.

References

2001 establishments in Australia
2006 disestablishments in Australia
Defunct political parties in Australia
Pensioners' parties
Political parties established in 2001
Political parties disestablished in 2006